Walter Aubrey Thomas (1864, Birkenhead, Cheshire – 1934, Wirral, Cheshire) (also known as Aubrey Thomas) was an English architect who practised from an office in Dale Street, Liverpool.  For his training he was articled to the Liverpool architect Francis Doyle, and established his own independent practice in about 1876. His works consisted mainly of commercial buildings.  He has been described as "the most individual Liverpool architect of the early 1900s".  At least seven of his works are designated by English Heritage as listed buildings, and these are included in the list below, of which the most notable is the Grade I listed Royal Liver Building.  Sharples and Pollard in the Pevsner Architectural Guides state that "his work shows admirable inventiveness and stylistic variety, as well as ambition matched by technological resourcefulness".
In 1886, Walter Aubrey Thomas married Maud Paris. Her family were said to be of Greek extraction. Together, they had seven children: Walter Glegge, who died in 1907 at the age of 21. Louise (Lulu), followed by Dorrit, Winifred (Winsome), Edward (Bill), Oliver and Humphrey. Despite all of his commitments, W A Thomas appears to have been a good father. The boys were educated by home tutors and the girls were sent to Cheltenham Ladies College. The family home, designed by their father, was called Bleak House – now Brooke House – at Parkgate. Later, another house was built for them at Dunstan Wood. He died on the 13th September 1934. Great grandchildren include Sophie Thomas, Edward Thomas & Oliver Aubrey-Thomas

Key

Works

References

Bibliography

Architects from Liverpool
People from Birkenhead
1864 births
1934 deaths